Hoogerwerf's rat (Rattus hoogerwerfi) is a species of rodent in the family Muridae.  It is named after zoologist Andries Hoogerwerf and is found only in western Sumatra, Indonesia, including Mount Leuser, where it is found only above 2000 m.
It is known from few museum specimens. Genetic analysis indicate its closest relative is Rattus korinchi, another Sumatran mountain rat from which it diverged around 1.4 million years ago.

References

 Baillie, J. 1996.  Rattus hoogerwerfi.   2006 IUCN Red List of Threatened Species.   Downloaded on 19 July 2007.

Rattus
Rats of Asia
Endemic fauna of Indonesia
Fauna of Sumatra
Rodents of Indonesia
Vulnerable fauna of Asia
Mammals described in 1939
Taxa named by Frederick Nutter Chasen
Taxonomy articles created by Polbot